Greenwood "Green" McCurtain (November 28, 1848 – December 27, 1910) was a tribal administrator and Principal Chief of the Choctaw Republic (1896–1900 and 1902–1906), serving a total of four elected two-year terms. He was the third of his brothers to be elected as chief. (His older brothers Jackson Frazier McCurtain and Edmund McCurtain had previously been elected as chief, serving a total of three terms.) He was a Republican in the late 19th century, leaning toward allotment and assimilation when the nation was under pressure by the United States government, as he believed the Choctaw needed to negotiate to secure their best outcome prior to annexation.

After 1906 and dissolution of tribal governments under the Dawes Act prior to Oklahoma achieving statehood, and the annexation of the Choctaw Republic by the United States, McCurtain was appointed as chief by the United States government. He served in that capacity until 1910 and his death in office. He was the last freely-elected Chief of the Choctaws until 1971.

Green McCurtain represented his tribe as a delegate at the Sequoyah Constitutional Convention. This was an effort by American Indian nations in Indian Territory to create an Indian-controlled state in what is now Oklahoma. They were not successful in getting Congressional support for this proposal. European Americans, who had established considerable presence in the Oklahoma Territory, had lobbied strongly for the entire area to be admitted as a regular state.

Personal life
Greenwood "Green" McCurtain was born on November 28, 1848, in Skullyville, Choctaw Nation, Indian Territory, the third son of Cornelius McCurtain, born in Mississippi, and Mayhiya "Amy" Blevins, both Choctaw. He was named after leader Greenwood LeFlore. Blevins's grandmother was Sho-Ma-Ka, a captive from a neighboring tribe who was adopted and assimilated into the Choctaw. McCurtain's paternal ancestry was of Irish origin. His Irish immigrant ancestor was Cornelius McCurtain, nephew of Cornelius Curtain, from County Cork, who settled in Spanish Florida in the 18th century with a land grant from the Spanish crown. He became a trader and married into the Choctaw tribe.

In 1833, McCurtain's parents and older brother Jackson had moved with numerous other Choctaw to Indian Territory as part of Indian Removal and the Choctaw Trail of Tears. His family became prominent as leaders of the tribe. His older brothers were Jackson Frazier McCurtain, born in Mississippi (1830-1885); Edmund Aaron McCurtain, (1842-1890); and David Cornelius McCurtain (1846-1874). They also had a younger brother Robert McCurtain (1853-1874), who was fatally shot at age 20 by a cousin.

Green's older brother Jackson Frazier McCurtain became a leader and served as president of the Choctaw senate before succeeding Isaac Garvin as president. Jackson served 1880-1884; he was succeeded by his brother Edmund, who served 1884-1886, a total of three two-year terms by the two of them.

Marriage and family
McCurtain was a Baptist, at a time when numerous Choctaw had become Protestants, influenced by missionaries.

He married Martha Ainsworth, a European-American woman, and together they had a son, D.C. McCurtain.  He later lived in Spiro, Oklahoma.  The senior McCurtain later married his second wife, Kate 'Kittie' Spring. They had a son and four daughters together: Alice, Lena, Bertha and Cora.

Political career
McCurtain was an imposing man, described as six foot two. He had a variety of positions locally and in the tribe before becoming principal chief after his brothers. In 1872 he served as sheriff of Skullyville County.

By the late nineteenth century, he represented the Tuskahoma, or Progressive party of his tribe, also known as the "Eagles", who began to favor negotiation with the United States over proposals for allotment and statehood of the Choctaw communal lands. Originally opposed to this, McCurtain came to believe he needed to negotiate to try to achieve the best outcome for the Choctaw.

The nation was violently torn by the prospect of losing their sovereign governance and lands: the day after the 1884 elections, Nationalist Charles Wilson was brutally killed. While more than one Progressive was implicated in the assassination, several Choctaw were acquitted and only Jackson Crow, an African American, was convicted and executed for the crime. In the 1890s, Silan Lewis, a committed Nationalist, killed five Progressives in related retaliatory political assassinations. He was convicted and executed by the Choctaw in 1894.

McCurtain continued to gain power in this period. He served as Choctaw National Treasurer for two terms and oversaw the distribution of $2 million in treaty settlements. Twice he served as the Choctaw Delegate to the U.S. federal government in Washington, DC.

He served as a member of his district's board of education within the tribe. In addition, he served as  district attorney. In 1896 and 1898, McCurtain was elected as Principal Chief of the Choctaw Nation. Term limits prevented him from a third successive term.

In 1902, he was eligible to run again and won the election. He won a fourth term in 1904. Before Oklahoma was admitted as a state, McCurtain represented the Choctaw Nation and served as a vice president at the Sequoyah Constitutional Convention in 1905. Attendees discussed proposals for Indian Territory to be admitted as a separate state, under Native American control. It is thought to have laid the groundwork for the Oklahoma Constitution.

Under the Dawes Act, in 1906 the U.S. government broke up tribal governments and institutions. The Bureau of Indian Affairs appointed McCurtain as chief. He acted under BIA supervision until his death in office in 1910.

Although originally a member of the Democratic Party, which represented a solid block in the states of the former Confederacy, McCurtain came to believe their Congressional delegation was hostile to his people. He shifted his affiliation to the Republican Party, and many of his tribesmen did the same. In those years, the Democrats had established the Solid South, a block they controlled because of having disenfranchised most blacks, Natives and other minorities at the turn of the century, and retaining full control of the region's congressionally apportioned seats, based on the total population (until 2003, the only Natives elected to the U.S. Congress from Oklahoma were all Democrats with the backing of the party - five in total). Even if McCurtain influenced many Choctaws to become Republicans, they remained both racial and political minorities in the new Southern state of Oklahoma, and as such they were cast aside by the ruling White Democratic establishment.

McCurtain's Haskell County home
His former home, the Green McCurtain House, was listed on the National Register of Historic Places on June 21, 1971. The house was in ruins at the time and has since been reconstructed. It is a two-story, L-shaped residence. The Green McCurtain House, once more in ruins following a tragic fire, is located in Kinta, Haskell County, Oklahoma.

Death
McCurtain died December 27, 1910, at his home in Kinta, Oklahoma. He was buried in San Bois Cemetery in Kinta, Haskell County, Oklahoma.

Legacy and honors
McCurtain County, Oklahoma was named for this family of chiefs.

Notes

Further reading
Lewis, Anna Lewis. "Jane McCurtain," The Chronicles of Oklahoma 11 (December 1933).
Meserve, John Bartlett. "The McCurtains," The Chronicles of Oklahoma 13 (September 1935). 
Thoburn, Joseph Bradford.  A Standard History of Oklahoma, Volume 5., Chicago: American Historical Society, 1916.

External links 

                   

Chiefs of the Choctaw
1848 births
1910 deaths
American people of Irish descent
Choctaw Nation of Oklahoma politicians
Native American leaders
Native American Christians
Oklahoma Democrats
Oklahoma Republicans
People of Indian Territory
People from Le Flore County, Oklahoma
Pre-statehood history of Oklahoma
Baptists from Oklahoma
19th-century Baptists
20th-century Native Americans
19th-century Native Americans